The 2019 Halton Borough Council election took place on 2 May 2019 to elect members of the Halton Borough Council in England. It was held on the same day as other local elections.

Results summary

Ward results

Appleton

Beechwood

Birchfield

Broadheath

Daresbury

Ditton

Farnworth

Grange

Halton Brook

Halton Castle

Halton Lea

Halton View

Heath

Hough Green

Kingsway

Mersey

Norton North

Norton South

Riverside

References

2019 English local elections
May 2019 events in the United Kingdom
2019
2010s in Cheshire